Vinko Möderndorfer (born 22 September 1958) is a Slovene writer, poet, playwright and theatre and film director.

Möderndorfer was born in Celje in 1958. He studied at the Academy for Theatre, Radio, Film and Television in Ljubljana and worked in numerous theatre companies around Slovenia. He started writing poetry in the late 1970s and since the early 1980s also published numerous works of prose, essays and drama as well as poetry and stories for children.

In 2000 he won the Prešeren Foundation Award for his book of short stories . In 2003 he received the Rožanc Award for Gledališče v ogledalu (The Theatre in a Mirror).

Film 

 Inferno (2014 Slovenian film) directed by Vinko Möderndorfer, starring Jozica Avbelj, Ludvik Bagari, Silvo Bozic

Published work

Poetry for children
  (The Day Starts So Well), 1993
  (Goodness, What A Great World), 1995
  (Why Elephants Are Light Sleepers), 2003
  (Puddle, Shoe, Snot and Sleeve) 2009

Prose for children
 , 1999
  (Langus the Cat and Gajka the Little Witch), 2002
  (The Return of Langus the Cat and Gajka the Little Witch), 2006
  (The Travels of Langus the Cat and Gajka the Little Witch), 2009
  (Redpants : Happy Stories of A Tiny Little Girl), 2010
  (The Great Wash), 2011

Dramska for children
  (Beware! Naugties at Work!), 1997
  (Mice at the Opera House), 2007

Poetry collections for adults 
  (Red Ritual), 1975
  (Small Poems), 1977
  (Moss), 1981
  (Body), 1989
  (A Little Night Love Poetry), 1993
  (The Devil's Laments), 1999
  (Poems from the Black Chronicle), 1999
  (Dark Blue Like September), 2003
  (Rock and Heart), 2004
  (Partings), 2007
  (Touchings), 2008
  (Wanderings), 2010
  (The Freedom of the World), 2011
  (I Have No More Fruit for You), 2011

Short stories 
  (The Small Death Circle), 1993
  (A Time Without Angels), 1994
  (Taro at Maria's), 1994
  (We Lay There Slobbering Like Hell), 1996
   (Some Loves), 1997
 Total (Total), 2000
  (The Other Room), 2004
  (Eneryday Memories: stories 1993 – 2007), 2008
  (Home Cinema: the Stories of a Movie Theatre), 2008
  (Blue Boat), 2010

Novels 
 , (Running After the Red She-Devil), 1996
  (Landscape No.2), 1998
 , (Outskirts), 2002
 , (Limited Sell By Date), 2003
 , (Sinjebradec's Loves), 2005
  (Insomnia), 2006
  (I Opened My Eyes and Went to the Window), 2007
 , (At Midday One Day), 2008
 , (No One Writes Letters Any More), 2011

Plays
  (Cruel Days), 1982
  (The Tale of Doctor Josef Mengele), 1986
 Help, 1989
 Camera obscura, 1990
  (Hamlet and Ophelia), 1994
  (The Transvestite Wedding), 1994
  (Amidst Gardens), 1995
  (The Four Seasons), 1996
  (Joseph and Mary), 1997
  (Choral Practice – Three Comedies), 1998
  (Slovenian Soap), 1999
  (Mother Died Twice), 1999
  (The Subtennant), 2000
  (The Fareinheit Club), 2001
  (Mephistopheles' Report), 2002
  (The Three Sisters), 2002
  (Slovenian Soap: Four Comedies), 2003
  (On the Farm), 2003
  (Dead Souls), 2004
  (At the Bottom), 2006
  (Cheque Mate or the School of Moral Renweal for Men and Women), 2006
  (Four Comedies), 2008
  (A Good Day to Die), 2009
  (''Blumen aus Krain: plays 1990 – 2010), 2011

Essay collections
  (The Theatre in a Mirror), 2001
  (Parallel Word : Thoughts on Creativity), 2005
  (Ode to Skin), 2011

References

Writers from Celje
Slovenian dramatists and playwrights
Slovenian poets
Slovenian male poets
Slovenian theatre directors
Slovenian film directors
Living people
1958 births
University of Ljubljana alumni